The 2012–13 ABA League was the 12th season of the ABA League, with 14 teams from Serbia, Slovenia, Montenegro, Croatia, Bosnia and Herzegovina, Macedonia and Hungary participating in it. This was the first time a team from Macedonia, MZT Skopje, and a team from Hungary, Szolnoki Olaj were taking part in this regional league, and the fourth time since the league's creation that team that is not from the former Yugoslavia participates in it. It was also for the first time that two best teams ABA League gained automatic access to the next seasons Euroleague competition, while third placed gained wild card to Euroleague qualification round.

Regular season started on September 29, 2012, and lasted until March 23, 2013. 2012–13 ABA League Final Four was held in Laktaši Sports Hall, Laktaši.

Team information

Regular season
The regular season began on September 29, 2012, and it will end on March 23, 2013.

Standings

Schedule and results
Source:

Final four
Matches in, Laktaši Sports Hall, Laktaši, Bosnia and Herzegovina
on 25 and 27 April 2013.

Semifinals

Final

Stats leaders

Points

Rebounds

Assists

Ranking MVP

MVP Round by Round
{| class="wikitable sortable" style="text-align: center;"
|-
! align="center"|Round
! align="center"|Player
! align="center"|Team
! align="center"|Efficiency
|-
|1||align="left"| Ivan Mimica||align="left"| Split||27
|-
|2||align="left"| Márton Báder||align="left"| Szolnoki Olaj||37
|-
|3||align="left"| Márton Báder (2)||align="left"| Szolnoki Olaj||58
|-
|4||align="left"| Vladimir Lučić||align="left"| Partizan||24
|-
|5||align="left"| Darko Planinić||align="left"| Široki||39
|-
|6||align="left"| Vladimir Lučić (2)||align="left"| Partizan||28
|-
|rowspan=2|7||align="left"| Romeo Travis||align="left"| Zadar||30
|-
|align="left"| Darko Planinić (2)||align="left"| Široki||30
|-
|8||align="left"| Terrico White||align="left"| Radnički||49
|-
|9||align="left"| Marko Šutalo||align="left"| Široki||28
|-
|10||align="left"| Darko Planinić (3)||align="left"| Široki||35
|-
|11||align="left"| Aron Baynes||align="left"| Union Olimpija||35
|-
|12||align="left"| Jaka Blažič||align="left"| Union Olimpija||38
|-
|13||align="left"| Čedomir Vitkovac||align="left"| Budućnost||36
|-
|14||align="left"| Márton Báder (3)||align="left"| Szolnoki Olaj||35
|-
|15||align="left"| Romeo Travis (2)||align="left"| Zadar||35
|-
|16||align="left"| Aleksandar Ćapin||align="left"| Radnički||29
|-
|rowspan=2|17||align="left"| Romeo Travis (3)||align="left"| Zadar||34
|-
|align="left"| Aleksandar Ćapin (2)||align="left"| Radnički||34
|-
|18||align="left"| Aleksandar Ćapin (3)||align="left"| Radnički||33
|-
|19||align="left"| Željko Šakić ||align="left"| Široki||31
|-
|20||align="left"| Todor Gečevski ||align="left"| MZT Skopje||37
|-
|21||align="left"| Aleksandar Ćapin (4)||align="left"| Radnički||36
|-
|22||align="left"| Terrico White (2)||align="left"| Radnički||38
|-
|23||align="left"| D. J. Strawberry||align="left"| Cibona||35
|-
|rowspan=2|24||align="left"| Aleksa Popović||align="left"| Budućnost||30
|-
|align="left"| Andrija Žižić||align="left"| Cibona||30
|-
|25||align="left"| Branko Jorović ||align="left"| Igokea||34
|-
|26||align="left"| Romeo Travis (4)||align="left"| Zadar||33
|-
|SF||align="left"| Aleksandar Ćapin (5)||align="left"| Radnički||31
|-
|F||align="left"| Raško Katić ||align="left"| Crvena zvezda||33
|-

Top 10 attendances

References

External links
 Official website
 ABA League at Eurobasket.com

2012-13
2012–13 in European basketball leagues
2012–13 in Serbian basketball
2012–13 in Slovenian basketball
2012–13 in Croatian basketball
2012–13 in Bosnia and Herzegovina basketball
2012–13 in Montenegrin basketball
2012–13 in Hungarian basketball
2012–13 in Republic of Macedonia basketball